General elections to the Cortes Generales were held in Spain in 1820. At stake were all 203 seats in the Congress of Deputies.

History
The 1820 elections were the first ones since the 1820 revolution. The elections were held under the Spanish Constitution of 1812.

Constituencies
A majority voting system was used for the election, with 33 multi-member constituencies and various single-member ones.

Results 

Most MPs were liberals, mainly from the moderate (or doceañista) faction.

References

 Estadísticas históricas de España: siglos XIX-XX.

Elections in Spain
1820 in Spain
1820
October 1820 events
Spain